A Matter of Respect was a professional wrestling supercard event produced by Extreme Championship Wrestling (ECW). It took place in May 1996 and May 1998.

Dates and venues

 
Recurring events established in 1996
Recurring events disestablished in 1998